The Nairobi Province Cricket Association is the Affiliate of Cricket Kenya responsible for cricketing activities in the City of Nairobi. These include overseeing the Kenya Kongonis, and Kanbis Tigers franchises in the East Africa Premier League and East Africa Cup cricket tournaments. It administers the Nairobi Province Cricket League which, prior to the setting up of national cricket Leagues by Cricket Kenya, provided the bulk of players selected to the Kenya national cricket team. It is through delegates selected by Annual General Meetings convened by the provincial bodies  such as NPCA, that Cricket Kenya's  picks its own officials.

Currently the NPCA is experiencing some differences with the teams in the region to a point where the teams started invitational T20 tournament and 50 Over league matches.

References

Cricket administration in Kenya
Sports organizations established in 1966
1966 establishments in Kenya